The 2018 Staysure Tour was the 27th season of the European Senior Tour, the professional golf tour for men aged 50 and above operated by the PGA European Tour. The season was officially called the Staysure Tour after UK-based insurance company Staysure became the Tour's first-ever title sponsor.

Tournament results
The 2018 schedule consisted of 19 events, including three new tournaments. In addition to new events in Denmark and Spain, the 2018 season ended in the Seychelles after the announcement of the inaugural MCB Tour Championship Indian Ocean Swing. The PGA Seniors Championship which had not been played since 2015 returned as the Staysure PGA Seniors Championship.

The numbers in brackets after the winners' names show the number of career wins they had on the European Senior Tour up to and including that event. This is only shown for players who are members of the tour.

  

For the tour schedule on the European Senior Tour's website, including links to full results, click here.

Qualifying school
The qualifying school was played in Portugal in late January and early February 2018. There were two 36-hole "stage 1" events with the leading players in these events joining a number of exempt players in the 72-hole final stage. As in 2016 and 2017 there were just five qualifying places available for the 2018 season. With 35 exempt players and a minimum field of 72 for the final stage a minimum of 37 qualified for the final stage from the two "stage 1" events.  There was a cut after 54 holes with players more than eight shots away from the fifth qualifying place not playing the final round.

The following five players gained their places on the 2018 tour:

Molina beat Ángel Franco with a birdie at the second playoff hole.

Leading money winners

There is a complete list on the official site here.

References

External links

European Senior Tour
European Senior Tour